Soknedal is a former municipality in the old Sør-Trøndelag county, Norway. The  municipality existed from 1841 until its dissolution in 1964. It is located in the western part of what is now the municipality of Midtre Gauldal in Trøndelag county. The administrative center of the municipality was the village of Soknedal, where the Soknedal Church is located. The municipality was named after the Soknedal valley in which it is located. The valley is named after the river Sokna which runs through the valley.

History
The municipality of Soknedal was established in 1841 when the old municipality of Støren was split into three separate municipalities: Horg (in the north), Støren (in the central part), and Soknedal (in the southwest). Initially, Soknedal had 1,966 residents. During the 1960s, there were many municipal mergers across Norway due to the work of the Schei Committee. On 1 January 1964, the municipalities of Budal (population: 529), Singsås (population: 1,554), Soknedal (population: 1,916), and Støren (population: 2,296) were all merged to form the new municipality of Midtre Gauldal.

See also
List of former municipalities of Norway

References

Midtre Gauldal
Former municipalities of Norway
1841 establishments in Norway
1964 disestablishments in Norway